Events in the year 2023 in Chad.

Incumbents 

 President: Mahamat Déby
 Prime Minister: Saleh Kebzabo

Events 
Ongoing — COVID-19 pandemic in Chad

 5 January – The government of Chad reports that an "attempted destabilization" plot led by military and human rights activists has failed. The statement says that the arrests of the 11 people involved took place later than 8 December 2022.
4 February - In the east of the country, the JEM fought to stop a force of 2,500 Chadian rebels that were on their way from Sudan to reinforce the troops outside N'Djamena.

References 

 
Chad
Chad
2020s in Chad
Years of the 21st century in Chad